Bard Kolang-e Olya Chahar Tall (also Romanized as Bard Kolang-e ‘Olyā Chahār Tall; also known as Bard Kolang) is a village in Zilayi Rural District, Margown District, Boyer-Ahmad County, Kohgiluyeh and Boyer-Ahmad Province, Iran. At the 2006 census, its population was 64, in 12 families.

References 

Populated places in Boyer-Ahmad County